Domingodó is a settlement in 
El Carmen del Darién Municipality, Chocó Department in Colombia.

Climate
Domingodó has a wet tropical rainforest climate (Af) with heavy rainfall from November to April and very heavy rainfall from May to October.

References

Chocó Department